Zagornaya Selitba is a rural locality (a selo) in Zagorno-Selitbinsky Selsoviet of Svobodnensky District, Amur Oblast, Russia. The population was 443 as of 2018. There are 9 streets.

Geography 
Zagornaya Selitba is located 85 km southwest of Svobodny (the district's administrative centre) by road. Sychyovka is the nearest rural locality.

References 

Rural localities in Svobodnensky District